Fereydun (also Romanized as Fereydūn, Farīdun, and Fereidoon) is a village in Saadatabad Rural District, Pariz District, Sirjan County, Kerman Province, Iran. At the 2006 census, its population was 56, in 18 families.

References 

Populated places in Sirjan County